Ephraim Mohale Stadium is a multi-use stadium in Modimolle, Limpopo, South Africa. It is currently used mostly for football matches and is the home venue of Modimolle Aces in the SAFA Second Division.

Sports venues in Limpopo
Soccer venues in South Africa